Labeo dhonti is fish in genus Labeo from the southern Congo Basin in Angola, the Democratic Republic of the Congo and Tanzania.

References

 

Labeo
Fish described in 1920